Bishara Wakim (Arabic: بشارة واكيم) (March 5, 1890 – November 30, 1949) Egyptian director and actor born in Faggala, Cairo in 1890.

Career
His real name is  Bisharah Yoakim educated in Collège-des-Frères (Bab-El-Louk), he was a Greek Catholic, in 1917 graduated from the School of Law and he started his life as a lawyer.

Began his acting career as a member of the   Abdul Rahman Rushdi theater group, then a member of George Abiad theater group, then with Egyptian actor Youssef Wahbi in his Ramses theatre group. He then moved to the Mounira El Mahdeya theater as actor, director and technical director.

Bishara Wakim honored by the Egyptian government for his achievements in film and theater, played the role of the Lebanese in most of the Egyptian movies of the thirties and the forties.

Bishara Wakim made about 381 films to the Egyptian cinema.

Bishara Wakim died on November 30, 1949.

Filmography 
1934 the son of the people
1936 radio song
1945 beginning of the month
1943 the son of the country
1947 the son of the Middle
1941 triumph of youth
1942 Ibn El-balad
1942 Bahbah Baghdad
1947 Alpremo
1947 Lebanese University
1946 I'm not an angel
1946 game of the six
1942 if you're rich
1945 great artist
1947 Baghdad, Cairo
1947 Qublni Oh Father
1945 Love story
1943 issue of the day
1947 Alby Dalily
1947 and my heart weep
1945 bloody hearts
1947 Alohm mask

See also 
 List of Egyptians

External links 
 

Egyptian male film actors
1890 births
Egyptian film directors
1949 deaths
Collège des Frères (Bab al-Louq) alumni